Tritoniopsis brucei is a species of dendronotid nudibranch. It is a marine gastropod mollusc in the family Tritoniidae.

Distribution
This species was described from Gough Island, Falklands.

References

Tritoniidae
Gastropods described in 1905